Picrodendraceae is a family of flowering plants, consisting of 80 species in 24 genera. These are subtropical to tropical and found in New Guinea, Australia, New Caledonia, Madagascar, continental Africa, and tropical America. Its closest relatives are Phyllanthaceae.

This family used to be known as the subfamily Oldfieldioideae of the Euphorbiaceae.

Taxonomy 

The family contains about 80 species organised into 24 genera (or three tribes of ten subtribes).

Genera 

 Androstachys
 Aristogeitonia
 Austrobuxus
 Celaenodendron
 Choriceras
 Dissiliaria
 Hyaenanche
 Kairothamnus
 Longetia
 Micrantheum
 Mischodon
 Neoroepera
 Oldfieldia
 Paradrypetes
 Parodiodendron
 Petalostigma
 Picrodendron
 Piranhea
 Podocalyx
 Pseudanthus
 Scagea
 Stachyandra
 Stachystemon
 Tetracoccus
 Voatamalo
 Whyanbeelia

References

 
Malpighiales families